Kahriz (also Romanized as Kahrīz) is a village in Mehmandust Rural District, Kuraim District, Nir County, Ardabil Province, Iran. At the 2006 census, its population was 154, in 35 families.

References 

Towns and villages in Nir County